Robert R. Kiley (September 16, 1935 – August 9, 2016) was an American public transit planner and supervisor, with a reputation of being able to save transit systems experiencing serious problems. From 2001 to 2006 he was the initial Commissioner of Transport for London, the public organisation empowered with running and maintaining London's public transport network.

Kiley also worked as a CIA agent, as the CEO of the Massachusetts Bay Transportation Authority, the Deputy Mayor of Boston, the chairman and CEO of the Metropolitan Transportation Authority and as President and CEO of the New York City Partnership. He is credited as being the architect of the revival of Boston and New York's ailing public transport systems in the 1970s and 1980s respectively.

Minneapolis, Boston and New York
Kiley was born in Minneapolis, Minnesota and educated at the University of Notre Dame in Indiana. He graduated magna cum laude and went on to study at Harvard's Graduate School. In 1963 he joined the Central Intelligence Agency. The BBC reports that although former colleagues say it would be incorrect to regard Bob Kiley as a "spook" he did travel around the world in his role as Manager of Intelligence Operations. He later served as Executive Assistant to the Agency Director Richard Helms.

Kiley left the Agency in 1970 and embarked a career in management, with particular emphasis on transport. He first worked as an assistant director at the Police Foundation in Washington D.C. Two years later he became deputy mayor of Boston, a position he held for three years. During his time as deputy mayor, he prioritised public safety during the court-mandated desegregation of schools. In 1975 Kiley took on two new roles – one as adjunct professor of public management at Boston University – and the other as chairman and CEO of the Massachusetts Bay Transportation Authority. He left the MBTA in 1979 and became a vice-president at the Management Analysis Center (now part of Cap Gemini). In 1983 Kiley moved down the east coast to become the chairman and CEO of the Metropolitan Transportation Authority (MTA).

He remained in the position until 1990 and in his time in the role secured state funding to the tune of $16bn to revitalise the railroads, buses and subways in the MTA region. Gene Russianoff, of the New York Straphangers Campaign, says that the money was spent wisely – "Even normally grudging New Yorkers say he did a good job," says Russianoff. The clean-up campaign involving arresting fare dodgers and cleaning up graffiti is now regarded as a prelude to the citywide policy of "zero tolerance" enforced by Rudy Giuliani during his time as Mayor in the 1990s.

In 1991 Kiley moved to a new role as President of the New York construction company Fischbach Corporation. He briefly held the role of chairman too before moving again to become President and CEO of the New York City Partnership in 1995. From 1994 to 1998 he was also principal of Kohlberg & Company, a private equity investment house. Kiley's Transport for London biography notes that Kiley was also "Member of the Council on Foreign Relations, board member of the Salzburg Seminar, the American Repertory Theater, MONY Group Inc, the Princeton Review Inc and Edison Schools, Inc. He was on the Advisory Board of the Harvard University Center for State and Local Government".

London
In October 2000, Kiley was head-hunted to become the first Commissioner of Transport for London (TfL), London's new integrated transport body, reporting to the Mayor of London directly. Following his appointment, Kiley was criticised by the press due to his £4m four-year contract, the use of a £2m grace and favour property in Belgravia, and his expatriate status. He was regarded by the press as "a strange bedfellow" for Ken Livingstone, the socialist elected in 2000 as London's first mayor. However, Livingstone considered Kiley "the best candidate", with very similar views on transportation to himself. In January 2001 Kiley became Chairman of London Regional Transport (the public body appointed by the Secretary of State for Transport to run London's Underground network of trains), replacing Sir Malcolm Bates.

Livingstone's and Kiley's were opposed to the government's plans for public-private partnerships (PPP) to run London Underground. Kiley was sacked as chairman of London Regional Transport in July 2001 amid repeated clashes with his boss, Transport Secretary Stephen Byers, and was replaced by Malcolm Bates who returned to lead the organisation. Remaining as Commissioner of Transport for London, he and Livingstone took the government to court in trying to prevent PPP. They failed, and in January 2003 two separate private companies - Metronet and Tube Lines - took control of maintaining various tube lines. In July 2003 powers for running the rest of the Tube network, including manning and maintaining the stations, was transferred to TfL and London Regional Transport became defunct. Kiley welcomed the opportunity to take greater control over the running of the Tube, but warned that he felt he would be hampered by PPP: "I maintain that the Government’s Public Private Partnership (PPP) is not the right way to manage the maintenance and renewal of the Tube. As they stand, the PPP contracts do not satisfactorily address the improvements to the Underground that TfL and the public demand. Nevertheless, we will do everything within our power to hold the infrastructure companies to account on those Tube improvements they have promised to deliver." Subsequently, the PPPs collapsed due to financial difficulties in the late 2000s.

In November 2005, Kiley announced that he would be standing down in January 2006, after five years in the job, albeit three years earlier than expected. Kiley was credited as helping Livingstone bring in the London congestion charge, introducing the Oyster card payment system, as well as improving the quality and frequency of Buses in London. He was paid almost £2 million in a settlement for standing down, and remained as a £3,200-a-day consultant. In a controversial interview with the London Evening Standard, he admitted he was unsure exactly what he did to deserve his consultancy fee, and denied rumours of a rift with Livingstone. He also revealed his struggles with alcoholism, exacerbated by overwork and the loss of his family in a car accident, followed by the death of his father shortly afterwards. He was replaced as Commissioner by Peter Hendy in February 2006.

Personal life
Kiley's first wife and two children died in a car accident in 1974. He was married to his second wife, Rona at the time of his death. They have two sons.

Notes

See also 
Richard Ravitch
Christopher O. Ward

References
A biography from Transport for London
A biography from BBC News
"A message from Bob" to London tube users
BBC News report on Kiley's sacking from the London Regional Transport
BBC News report on Stephen Byer's sacking from the UK Government by Tony Blair
Tube transfers to TfL control
Evening Standard article on Kiley's contract extension in December 2004
The Transport for London (TFL) website
William Finnegan, Letter from London, "Underground Man—Can the former C.I.A. agent who saved New York’s subway get the Tube back on track?", The New Yorker, February 9, 2004, p. 52-?

External links
Images of Bob Kiley from the National Portrait Gallery

1935 births
2016 deaths
American expatriates in the United Kingdom
University of Notre Dame alumni
Harvard University alumni
Executives of Metropolitan Transportation Authority (New York)
People associated with transport in London
British public transport executives
Massachusetts Bay Transportation Authority people